Alcovy is an unincorporated community in Newton County, in the U.S. state of Georgia.

History
A post office was in operation at Alcovy from 1893 until 1901. The community took its name from the nearby Alcovy River. Alcovy was a depot on the Georgia Railroad. Variant names were "Alcova" and "Alcovee".

References

Unincorporated communities in Newton County, Georgia
Unincorporated communities in Georgia (U.S. state)